The Jingmen–Jingzhou high-speed railway is a high-speed railway line currently under construction in Hubei, China.

Route
The railway runs from north to south, approximately parallel to the existing freight-only Jingmen–Shashi railway. The northern terminus is Jingmen West, the southern terminus is Jingzhou, and there is one intermediate station, Shayang West.

Stations

References

High-speed railway lines in China
High-speed railway lines under construction